The Infamous Miss Revell is a lost 1921 American silent mystery film directed by Dallas M. Fitzgerald and starring Alice Lake. It was produced and released by Metro Pictures.

Cast
Alice Lake as Julien Revell/Paula Revell
Cullen Landis as Max Hildreth
Jackie Saunders as Lillian Hildreth
Lydia Knott as Mary Hildreth
Herbert Standing as Samuel Pangborn
Alfred Hollingsworth as Maxwell Putnam
Stanley Goethals as Revell Child
Francis Carpenter as Revell Child
Mae Giraci as Revell Child (credited as May Giraci)
Geraldine Condon as Revell Child

References

External links

1921 films
Lost American films
Films based on short fiction
American silent feature films
American black-and-white films
American mystery films
1921 mystery films
Films directed by Dallas M. Fitzgerald
Metro Pictures films
1921 lost films
Lost mystery films
1920s American films
Silent mystery films